Figures are from the United States Census, 2010.

See also
Highest-income states in the United States

Highest-income census metropolitan areas in Canada

References
 U.S. Census Bureau

United States demography-related lists
Income in the United States